The Metropolitan Television Alliance, LLC (MTVA) is a group organized in the wake of the loss of the transmission facilities atop the World Trade Center in 2001. Its mission is to identify, design and build a facility suitable for the long-term requirements of its member stations to meet their over-the-air digital broadcast requirements. This could include designing facilities for the Freedom Tower in Lower Manhattan, assessing alternative sites and technologies and dealing with local, state and federal authorities on relevant issues.

The group, which includes stations WABC-TV 7, WCBS-TV 2, WFUT–TV 68, WNBC–TV 4, WNET–TV 13, WNJU–TV 47, WNYE-TV 25, WNYW–TV 5, WPIX–TV 11, WPXN-TV 31, WWOR-TV 9 and WXTV–TV 41, signed a memorandum of understanding in 2003 with the developer, Larry A. Silverstein, to install antennas atop the Freedom Tower. Broadcasters have used the Empire State Building (and, to a lesser degree, 4 Times Square) since the September 11 attacks. In 2006, control of the project was transferred to the Port Authority of New York and New Jersey, with which further discussions have been ongoing.

The group received a grant from the NTIA to study distributed transmission system (DTS) in New York City. Multiple tests were run from various sites in the New York and Newark region in 2006 and 2007 by MTVA and individual member stations, with the use of distributed transmission on a permanent, non-experimental basis ultimately approved for US stations by the Federal Communications Commission on November 7, 2008.

In 2008, Saul Shapiro was appointed President.

References

Television organizations in the United States